Skee-Ball is an arcade game and one of the first redemption games. It is played by rolling a ball up an inclined lane and over a "ball-hop" hump (resembling a ski jump) that jumps the ball into bullseye rings. The object of the game is to collect as many points as possible by having the ball fall into holes in the rings which have progressively increasing point values the higher the ring is.

History
Skee-Ball was invented and patented in 1908 by Joseph Fourestier Simpson, a resident of Vineland, New Jersey. On December 8, 1908, Simpson was granted  for his "Game". Simpson licensed the game to John W. Harper and William Nice Jr. who created the Skee-Ball Alley Company and began marketing the thirty-two-foot games in early 1909. The first advertisement for Skee-Ball appeared on April 17, 1909, in Billboard magazine. About two months later the first alley was sold. Alleys continued to sell slowly over the next few years.

In January 1910, Nice died unexpectedly, leaving Harper without the necessary funding for promotion. The company struggled for the rest of 1910, 1911 and 1912. Simpson worked with Harper, but they were having difficulty making any headway, and by December 1912 the Skee-Ball Alley Company was moribund.

In 1910, Jonathan Dickinson Este became enamored of the game, and in 1913 he helped Simpson and John W. Harper to revitalize the company. Este installed two alleys at a Princeton location, near the university, to see how well they would do. After a few weeks, interest in the game fizzled, but in 1914 Este installed Skee-Ball in rented space on Atlantic City's boardwalk. He purchased the patent and all rights to the game from Simpson, incorporated The J. D. Este Company to build and market the game, and hired Harper as general manager. In 1917 Este enlisted in the military and turned over operation of the company to his business partners. After his return in 1919 he sold The J. D. Este Company to his partners and exited the business.

Este's business partners renamed the company the "Skee-Ball Company". They operated the manufacturing and distribution of the game until 1928 when the game was sold to Herman Bergoffen, Hugo Piesen, and Maurice Piesen, who incorporated the National Skee-Ball Company. In 1929, the National Skee-Ball Company of Coney Island, New York, trademarked the name Skee-Ball.

The National Skee-Ball Company organized the first national Skee-Ball tournament at Skee-Ball Stadium in Atlantic City. The tournament alleys were shorter than the alleys that Simpson had built. Over one hundred contestants qualified to play in the tournament. $2400 in prizes were awarded to the winners.

In 1935, Bergoffen died unexpectedly in Atlantic City, leaving Hugo and Maurice Piesen to run the National Skee-Ball Company. In June 1936, The Rudolph Wurlitzer Manufacturing Company bought all of the rights to the game and set up a games division. Wurlitzer produced more than five thousand Skee-Ball alleys and began selling them in December 1936, but they ceased production of alleys in 1937 as demand weakened. Beginning in 1942, Wurlitzer shifted its focus from amusement devices to the war effort by building equipment for the United States government.

As the war drew to a close the Philadelphia Toboggan Company (PTC) contacted Wurlitzer to ask about either licensing the rights to Skee-Ball or selling it outright. By January 1946, PTC was the new owner and manufacturer of Skee-Ball. That lasted until 1977 when Skee-Ball, Inc., was spun-off from PTC under the same ownership. By 1984, Joe Sladek and three other partners had bought the company. Over the next several years Sladek bought out his partners and renamed the company Skee-Ball Amusement Games Inc. In February 2016, Bay Tek Games, Inc., of Pulaski, Wisconsin, acquired Skee-Ball Amusement Games, Inc., acquiring the rights to the legacy Skee-Ball game and trademark in the process, and moved its manufacturing to Pulaski.

Super Ball!!, a version of skee-ball, was a pricing game on the American game show The Price Is Right from 1981 to 1998.

Skee-Ball is now a social sport played in bars in North America, with leagues forming under various banners.

Gameplay
Gameplay varies depending on the particular machine but, normally, a player, after inserting appropriate payment, receives a queue of (usually nine) balls made of either polished masonite or heavy plastic and each approximately three inches in diameter. Each machine has an inclined ramp, 10–13 feet long, up which the player must roll the balls. A sudden increase in incline at the end of the ramp (called the "ball-hop") launches the balls above the plane of the ramp toward a series of rings that direct the balls into holes of varying point values, with the smallest and hardest to reach usually giving the most points. The machine dispenses coupons to the player, based on scoring thresholds, either during the game or after the game ends. The coupons are typically traded at the arcade for prizes. Some machines award large coupon bonuses to players who attain or surpass a posted high score.

At traveling carnival midways, prizes are typically won by scoring a certain minimum number of points in one game. This requires an attendant to hand out prizes immediately at the end of games, which is not common in arcade settings. Usually small prizes can be traded for medium prizes and mediums for large. Perfect or nearly perfect scores earn the largest prize available, while very low scores may earn nothing at all.

See also
 Bull's-Eye Ball
 Fascination (game)

Notes

References

External links

 Skeeball.com, web page of Skee-Ball, Inc
 The History of Skee-Ball Machines (article on Techdose.com)
 Web page of The SKEE League, Chicago's First and Largest Skeeball League
 Web page of United Social Sports, a national Skeeball league
 Bay Tek Games Inc.
 Brewskee-Ball, the first-ever National Skee-Ball League
https://www.theatlantic.com/technology/archive/2016/11/why-skee-ball-doesnt-change/509117/

American inventions
Ball games
Brands that became generic
Games of physical skill
Carnival games
Redemption games